The Palais de justice historique de Lyon is a building located Quai Romain Rolland, on the right bank of the Saône, in the 5th arrondissement of Lyon. In 1996, it was classified as monument historique.

History
Its construction began in 1835 and ended in 1845, under the direction of architect Louis-Pierre Baltard. It was built in the same location as the previous courthouses that followed since the 15th century.

The Palais de Justice de Lyon is often called the 'Palace of the twenty-four columns'. This is one of the finest neo-classical buildings in France.

In 1995, construction of a new courthouse in the district of La Part-Dieu allowed the transfer of the Tribunal de Grande Instance, the Tribunal d'Instance and the Tribunal de commerce de Lyon. The Cour d'appel of Lyon and the Cour d'assises of the Rhône remained installed in what is now the historic courthouse of Lyon.

In 2008, the building was the subject of a profound renovation (accessibility, upgrading, security...).

Famous trials
There were some famous trials in this building:
 August 1884: Italian anarchist Sante Geronimo Caserio, murder of President of the Republic Sadi Carnot, was sentenced to death.
 January 1945: Charles Maurras was sentenced to life imprisonment and national degradation.
 July 1987: Klaus Barbie was sentenced to life imprisonment for crimes against humanity during the Second World War.

References

Courthouses
Buildings and structures in Lyon
5th arrondissement of Lyon
Monuments historiques of Lyon